Khālid ibn Yazīd (full name Abū Hāshim Khālid ibn Yazīd ibn Muʿāwiya ibn Abī Sufyān),  668–704 or 709, was an Umayyad prince and purported alchemist.

As a son of the Umayyad caliph Yazid I, Khalid was supposed to become caliph after his elder brother Mu'awiya II died in 684. However, Marwan I, a senior Umayyad from another branch of the clan, was chosen over the much younger Khalid. Despite having lost the caliphate to Marwan, Khalid forged close ties with Marwan's son and successor, the caliph Abd al-Malik, who appointed him to successive administrative and military roles. He participated in a number of successful military campaigns in 691, but then chose to retire to his Homs estate, where he lived out the rest of his life. He may have engaged in some level of poetry and hadith scholarship.

A large number of alchemical writings were attributed to Khalid, including also many alchemical poems. Khalid's purported alchemical activity was probably part of a legend that evolved in 9th-century Arabic literary circles, which also falsely credited him with sponsoring the first translations of Greek philosophical and scientific works into Arabic (in reality, caliphal sponsorship of translations started during the reign of al-Mansur, 754–775).

Some of the Arabic alchemical works attributed to Khalid were later translated into Latin under the Latinized name Calid.

Life

Khalid was likely born around 668. He was the son of the Umayyad caliph Yazid I and Fakhita bint Abi Hashim ibn Utba ibn Rabi'a. When his older half-brother Mu'awiya ibn Yazid died after a very short reign as caliph in 684, Khalid was still a minor. A struggle for succession broke out between the supporters of the young Khalid and those who favored Marwan ibn al-Hakam (623 or 626–685), who was not part of the ruling branch of the Umayyad family (the Sufyanids), but was much older and more experienced. Eventually Marwan was elected by the Umayyad Syrian elites on the condition that Khalid would directly succeed him. Marwan also married Khalid's mother Fakhita to seal the bond between him and his would-be successor Khalid. 

However, seeing that Khalid was politically weak, Marwan removed both him and his younger brother Abd Allah ibn Yazid from the line of succession in favor of his own sons Abd al-Malik and Abd al-Aziz. When Khalid reminded Marwan of the promise he made at his ascension, Marwan publicly insulted his mother Fakhita. According to what is probably a later legend, Fakhita killed Marwan in revenge. Despite this, close ties developed between Khalid and Marwan's son Abd al-Malik, and when the latter became caliph Khalid became his adviser and married his daughter A'isha.

In the summer of 691, Khalid was made a commander in Abd al-Malik's siege of the Qaysi leader Zufar ibn al-Harith al-Kilabi in al-Qarqisiya in the Jazira. After this victory, the caliph appointed Khalid commander of his army's left wing at the Battle of Maskin (691) against Mus'ab ibn al-Zubayr, which resulted in the Umayyad conquest of Zubayrid Iraq.

After this short spell as a military commander, Khalid appears to have spent the rest of his life in Homs, which had been appointed to him as an emirate already by Marwan. He may have engaged in some level of poetry and hadith scholarship. He died in 704 or 709.

Legend
A number of Arabic treatises on alchemy and alchemical poems have been attributed to Khalid. These writings are generally regarded as pseudepigraphs (false attributions) dating from the 8th or 9th centuries at the very earliest. It is not clear why these works were attributed to Khalid specifically.

According to one theory advanced by the German scholar Manfred Ullmann, the idea that Khalid had been interested in alchemy originated in the 9th-century historian al-Baladhuri, who quoted his teacher al-Mada'ini's description of Khalid as "pursuing that which is impossible, that is, alchemy". According to Ullmann's theory, al-Mada'ini's lost work would have read "pursuing that which is impossible" (referring to Khalid's failure to ascend to the caliphate), while the words "that is, alchemy" would have been added as an interpretative gloss by al-Baladhuri, who thus sparked the legend of Khalid as an alchemist. According to another theory proposed by the French scholar Pierre Lory, the writings attributed to Khalid were originally written in a much humbler environment than the courtly milieus in which most 8th- and 9th-century philosophers and scientists worked, and were purposefully attributed to an Umayyad prince to lend them an aura of nobility.

In any case, Khalid was widely associated with alchemy from the 9th century on by such authors as al-Jahiz (776–868/869), al-Baladhuri (820–892), al-Tabari (839–923), and Abu al-Faraj al-Isfahani (897–967). He was also credited by al-Jahiz and later by Ibn al-Nadim with having been the first to order the translation of Greek philosophical and scientific works into Arabic. In reality, however, these translations only started in the late 8th century (at the very earliest during the reign of the Abbasid caliph al-Mansur), and the credit given for them to Khalid is generally held to be part of the legend surrounding him.

Alchemical writings
The great majority of alchemical works attributed to Khalid have not yet been studied. A relatively large amount of Arabic works are still extant. There are also some works which have been preserved in Latin, either with or without corresponding Arabic original.

Arabic works
The following Arabic works are extant:
 ("The Diwan of the Stars and the Paradise of Wisdom", a collection of alchemical poems and treatises compiled at a relatively late date)
 ("The Book of the Element")
 ("The Book of his Testament to his Son on the Art")
 ("The Instructive Word on the Divine Art")
 (Epistle on the Noble Art and its Properties")
Various unnamed alchemical treatises, poems and epistles

A number of Arabic works listed by Ibn al-Nadim in his  (written 987) are now presumably lost:

Latin works
It is doubtful whether some of these are actual translations from the Arabic, but at least two Latin treatises have been found to closely correspond with an existing Arabic original. It was the first full-length Arabic alchemical work to be translated into Latin, a task which was completed on 11 February 1144 by the English Arabist Robert of Chester. Another work which is extant both in Arabic and in Latin is an untitled  ("Epistle"), whose Latin translator is unknown.

Other Latin texts attributed to Khalid include:

 ("The Book of the Secrets of Alchemy")
 ("The Book of the Three Words")

See also

Alchemy and chemistry in the medieval Islamic world
Ibn Umayl
Jabir ibn Hayyan
Hermetica § Arabic alchemical Hermetica
Latin translations of the 12th century

Notes

References

Bibliography

Alchemists of the medieval Islamic world
668 births
704 deaths
Sons of Umayyad caliphs
Generals of the Umayyad Caliphate
People of the Second Fitna
7th-century Arabs